Nances Creek is a census-designated place and unincorporated community in Calhoun County, Alabama, United States. Its population was 407 as of the 2010 census.

Demographics

References

Census-designated places in Calhoun County, Alabama
Census-designated places in Alabama